Neoblastobasis wangithiae is a moth in the  family Blastobasidae. It is found in Kenya, where it is known from coastal lowland habitats in the southeast of the country.

The length of the forewings is 4.1 mm. The forewings are pale brown intermixed with brown and brown scales tipped with white. The hindwings are pale grey.

The larvae feed on Pleiocarpa pycnantha.

Etymology
The species is named in honour of Juliet Wangithi Muriuki, who provided technical support for the collection of fruit and reared many of the moth specimens included in the paper in which the species was described.

References

Endemic moths of Kenya
Moths described in 2010
Blastobasidae
Moths of Africa